The 1941–42 Kansas Jayhawks men's basketball team represented the University of Kansas during the 1941–42 college men's basketball season. Politician Bob Dole was a member of the team.

Roster
Charles B. Black
Jack Ballard
Donald Blair
John Buescher
George Dick
Bob Dole
Ray Evans
Wilson Fitzpatrick
Vance Hall
Thomas Hunter
Warren Israel
Bob Johnson
Max Kissell
Ralph Miller
Richard Miller
Marvin Sollenberger
Paul Turner
Hubert Ulrich
Charles Walker

Schedule

References

Kansas Jayhawks men's basketball seasons
Kansas
Kansas
Kansas
Kansas